Berberis reticulinervis is a shrub in the family Berberidaceae described as a species in 1999. It is endemic to China, known from the Provinces or Gansu, Sichuan, and Xizang (Tibet).

References

Endemic flora of China
reticulinervis
Plants described in 1999